Bettws-y-Crwyn is a civil parish in Shropshire, England.  It contains six listed buildings that are recorded in the National Heritage List for England.  Of these, one is listed at Grade II*, the middle of the three grades, and the others are at Grade II, the lowest grade.  The parish is almost entirely rural, and the listed buildings consist of a church, a tomb in the churchyard, three farmhouses and a farm building.


Key

Buildings

References

Citations

Sources

Lists of buildings and structures in Shropshire